Sialkot Dry Port is located in Sambrial, Punjab, Pakistan, 15 km west of Sialkot and 4 km south of Sialkot International Airport. The dry port provides transportation, logistics and supply chain solutions to connect Sialkot's robust economy to domestic and international markets as well as several other localities including Gujranwala, Wazirabad and Gujrat. The port is a joint venture between the business community in Sialkot who on 16 May 1984 formed the "Sialkot Dry Port Trust". The dry port was formally inaugurated in 1986.

See also 
 Dry Ports in Pakistan

References

External links 
 Sialkot Dry Port Trust

Economy of Sialkot
Dry ports of Pakistan